Guy Bridges Kibbee (March 6, 1882 – May 24, 1956) was an American stage and film actor.

Early years
Kibbee was born in El Paso, Texas. His father was editor of the El Paso Herald-Post newspaper, and Kibbee learned how to set type at age 7. At the age of 14, he ran away to join a traveling show. His younger brother was actor Milton Kibbee.

Career 
Kibbee began his entertainment career on Mississippi riverboats. He became an actor in traveling stock companies. He began to lose his hair at 19. In his early days on stage, he was a romantic leading man.

In 1930, he made his debut on Broadway in the play Torch Song, which won acclaim in New York and attracted the interest of Hollywood. Shortly afterwards, Paramount Pictures signed Kibbee, and he moved to California. He later became part of Warner Bros.'s stock company, contract actors who cycled through different productions in supporting roles. Kibbee's specialty was daft and jovial characters; he is perhaps best remembered for the films 42nd Street (1933), Gold Diggers of 1933 (1933), Captain Blood (1935), and Mr. Smith Goes to Washington (1939), though he also played the expatriate inn owner in Joan Crawford's Rain (1932). One of his few starring performances during this period was the title role of Babbit (1934), a much altered and compressed version of the Sinclair Lewis novel.

He is also remembered for his performance as Mr. Webb, editor of the Grover's Corners, New Hampshire newspaper, and father of Emily Webb (played by Martha Scott) in the film version of the classic Thornton Wilder play Our Town.

Personal life 
Kibbee's first wife was Helen Shay, with whom he raised a family in Staten Island until their divorce. One of their sons was Robert Kibbee, an academic who became chancellor of the City University of New York.

His second wife was the former Ethel "Brownie" Reed. They had a daughter, Shirley Ann, and were married for 31 years.

Death 
Kibbee died of Parkinson's disease at the Percy Williams Home for actors in East Islip, New York on May 24, 1956.

In popular culture
"Guy Kibbee eggs" is a breakfast dish consisting of a hole cut out of the center of a slice of bread, and an egg cracked into it, all of which is fried in a skillet.  The actor prepared this dish in the 1935 Warner Bros. film Mary Jane's Pa, hence the eponym. The dish is also known by other names, such as "egg in a basket" and "egg in a frame".

Kibbee is also mentioned in the iconic Hot August Night concert/album performed by Neil Diamond in 1972 at the Greek Theatre in Los Angeles:

Filmography

Television appearances

References

External links
 

 
 
 

1882 births
1956 deaths
American male film actors
American male stage actors
American male television actors
Male actors from El Paso, Texas
Deaths from Parkinson's disease
Neurological disease deaths in New York (state)
20th-century American male actors
Warner Bros. contract players
People from East Islip, New York